The Sarah Jane Adventures Collection is a boxset of ten audiobooks based on the British science fiction television series The Sarah Jane Adventures, itself a spin-off of Doctor Who.

The first eight stories are read by Elisabeth Sladen, with the last two read by Daniel Anthony and Anjli Mohindra due to Sladen's death. Prior to the release of the set, each audiobook received individual releases between 2007 and 2011.

Audiobooks

References

External links
The Sarah Jane Adventures Collection at Audiogo.com (Publisher)

Sarah Jane Smith audio plays